Zarzuela means:

 Zarzuela, a Spanish lyric-dramatic genre
 Zarzuela de mariscos, a Catalan seafood stew
 the Palacio de la Zarzuela, residence of the Spanish King
 the Teatro de la Zarzuela in Madrid
 several places in Spain:
 Zarzuela, Cuenca, a municipality in the province of Cuenca, in the autonomous community of Castile-La Mancha
 Zarzuela de Jadraque, a municipality in the province of Guadalajara, in the autonomous community of Castile-La Mancha
 Zarzuela del Monte, a municipality in the province of Segovia in the autonomous community of Castile-León
 Zarzuela del Pinar, a municipality in the province of Segovia in the autonomous community of Castile-León